Dynamicism, also termed the dynamic hypothesis or the dynamic hypothesis in cognitive science or dynamic cognition, is a approach in cognitive science polpularized by the work of philosopher Tim van Gelder. It argues that differential equations and dynamical systems are more suited to modeling cognition rather than the commonly used ideas of symbolicism, connectionism, or traditional computer models.  It is closely related to Dynamical neuroscience.

References 

Cognitive science
Cognitive modeling